"Super Max!" is a song performed by Dutch music group the Pitstop Boys, who are a fan group for Dutch Formula One driver Max Verstappen. The song was released on 16 July 2016, in the form of a music video.

Background 
Max Verstappen is a Dutch Formula One driver who made his debut in the series in 2015, driving for Toro Rosso. In 2016 at the 2016 Spanish Grand Prix, he would switch seats with Daniil Kvyat, moving to Red Bull Racing, the senior team for Red Bull. He won in his first race with Red Bull, becoming the youngest ever winner, the youngest driver to score a podium finish and the youngest ever to lead a lap of a Formula One race, breaking the previous records held by Sebastian Vettel. In the process, he also became the first Dutchman to win a Grand Prix and the first Grand Prix winner born in the 1990s.

The Pitstop Boys are a group of three Max Verstappen fans, Rob Toonen, Marco Mars and Jeroen Hilgenberg, part of the "Oranje Army", a colloquial name for Verstappen's supporters.

A sequel to the song was made for Verstappen's title run against Lewis Hamilton in the 2021 season, called "Super Max! YoHé, YoHo!"

They also made another song called 'Let's Go Lando" in honour of British Formula One driver Lando Norris.

Rise to popularity 
The song would become a viral hit, after Verstappen continued to gain success in the series. The song became used as a fight song for whenever Verstappen won, or as a meme for anything that Verstappen did. The song was used as a chant within the "Oranje Army", which is considered to be the name of Verstappen's fanbase. In 2021, Verstappen would win the drivers' championship in the 2021 Formula One season, causing the song to be charted Spotify's Viral 50 in many countries, including No. 1 in the Netherlands, and No. 5 in the global chart. Verstappen was also seen partying to the song after his championship.

Track listing

References 

2016 songs
Viral videos
Max Verstappen